Francisco Dumeng Alers is a retired male track and field athlete from Isabela, Puerto Rico. He won the silver medal in the 110 metres hurdles at the 1971 Central American and Caribbean Championships in Athletics, and the bronze medal at the 1974 Central American and Caribbean Games.

References

Year of birth missing (living people)
Living people
People from Isabela, Puerto Rico
Puerto Rican male hurdlers
Central American and Caribbean Games bronze medalists for Puerto Rico
Competitors at the 1974 Central American and Caribbean Games
Athletes (track and field) at the 1979 Pan American Games
Central American and Caribbean Games medalists in athletics
Pan American Games competitors for Puerto Rico